Alessandra Celletti (born 12 February 1962) is an Italian mathematician. She earned a master's degree in mathematics in 1984 at the University of Rome La Sapienza, and a PhD in 1989 at the Swiss Federal Institute of Technology in Zurich (ETH) under the supervision of Jürgen Moser and Jörg Waldvogel. Her research activity concerns dynamical systems, Kolmogorov–Arnold–Moser (KAM) theory, and celestial mechanics.

She is a founding member of the Italian Society of Celestial Mechanics and Astrodynamics, which she chaired from 2001 to 2013. Since 1993 she has coordinated the international CELMEC meetings. She is full professor of Mathematical Physics at the University of Rome Tor Vergata. 
Since 2010 she has been an honorary member of the "Celestial Mechanics Institute". Since 2016 she is editor-in-chief of the journal  Celestial Mechanics and Dynamical Astronomy. In 2012 she was an invited speaker at the 6th European Congress of Mathematics. In 2015 she was elected vice-President and in 2018 became President of the Scientific Committee in Celestial Mechanics of the International Astronomical Union. Since 2012 she has been a member of the Scientific Committee of the European Women in Mathematics (EMS/EWM) and since 2017 she has chaired the Women in Mathematics Committee of the European Mathematical Society.
Since April 2020 she is member of the Governing Board and Vice-President of “ANVUR - Italian National Agency for the Evaluation of Universities and Research Institutes”. 

In 2007, her book Ordine e caos nel sistema solare in collaboration with Ettore Perozzi was a finalist for the Galileo Popular Science Prize.

The asteroid 2005 DJ1 has been named in her honour (117539 Celletti).

Notes

References
The Waltz of the Planets, Praxis-Springer Verlag, 2007, with Ettore Perozzi
Ordine e Caos nel Sistema Solare, Utet, 2007, with Ettore Perozzi
Pianeti per caso, Utet, 2012, with Ettore Perozzi
Stability and Chaos in Celestial Mechanics, Springer-Praxis, 2010

External links
Alessandra Celletti Department of Mathematics University of Rome Tor Vergata
Società Italiana di Meccanica Celeste e Astrodinamica
CELMEC meetings
Stability problems in Celestial Mechanics 1999, su harvard.edu

1962 births
Living people
20th-century Italian mathematicians
21st-century Italian mathematicians
University of Rome Tor Vergata alumni
ETH Zurich alumni
Academic staff of the University of Rome Tor Vergata
20th-century women mathematicians
21st-century women mathematicians
Academic journal editors